Reinaldo Miguel Silva Ventura (born 16 May 1978 in Vila Nova de Gaia) is a Portuguese roller hockey player. Renowned as a prolific goalscorer with a strong middle distance shot, he is capable of occupying both the midfielder or the forward position in a roller rink surface. Ventura was a leading name for FC Porto, winning a combined total of 31 national titles and 1 CERS Cup during his 26 years spell with the club.

From 1997 to 2012 he was a main player in the Portugal national roller hockey team. He was a member of the squad that won the Rink Hockey World Championship, in 2003. Ventura was the captain at the 2008 Rink Hockey European Championship, where Portugal was runners-up. He was again the captain at the 2009 Rink Hockey World Championship, winning this time the 3rd place, and at the 2010 Rink Hockey European Championship, lost to Spain in the final by 8-2. He left the National Team after the 2012 CERH European Championship. He came back to the national team in 2016, joining the team that won the 2016 CERH European Championship.

Honours

Club
FC Porto
Portuguese First Division: 1998–99, 1999–00, 2001–02, 2002–03, 2003–04, 2004–05, 2005–06, 2006–07, 2007–08, 2008–09, 2009–10, 2010–11, 2012–13
Portuguese Cup: 1995–96, 1997–98, 1998–99, 2004–05, 2005–06, 2007–08, 2008–09, 2012–13
Portuguese Supercup: 1996, 1998, 2000, 2005, 2006, 2007, 2008, 2009, 2011, 2013
CERS Cup: 1995–96

OC Barcelos
CERS Cup: 2015–16, 2016–17

International
Portugal
FIRS World Cup: 2003
CERH European Championship: 2016
Montreux Nations Cup: 2009, 2011
World Games: 2001

External links
Reinaldo Ventura International Statistics
Reinaldo Ventura Profile

1978 births
Place of birth missing (living people)
Living people
Portuguese roller hockey players
Roller hockey forwards

World Games gold medalists
Competitors at the 2001 World Games
Sportspeople from Vila Nova de Gaia